Hugpatch Records is a record label based out of Brooklyn, New York. It was founded in 2006 by Maxwell Williams. It was originally a 7" single only record label, which gives it the reputation as "the world's tiniest record label."  Its releases are limited to 500 copies of each record. Releases include singles by Brooklyn-based indie-pop band The Besties (HP01), Gijon-based pop group Nosoträsh (HP02) and Austin, Texas-based minimal pop trio Yellow Fever (HP03). In 2007, Hugpatch was one of the organizers of the pop music festival, NYC Popfest. Later on, the label began releasing full-length albums, beginning with The Besties' Home Free (HP08), originally released on CD, and later as a vinyl LP. The label also produces an internet radio show for the American Apparel radio station, Viva-Radio.com.

See also
 List of record labels

External links
 Official site
 Viva-Radio.com/Hugpatch
 Yellow Fever Review on Indie-MP3.co.uk

American record labels
Record labels established in 2006
Indie rock record labels
Indie pop record labels